Strongylognathus karawajevi is a species of ant in the genus Strongylognathus. It is endemic to Ukraine.

References

Strongylognathus
Hymenoptera of Europe
Endemic fauna of Ukraine
Insects described in 1966
Taxonomy articles created by Polbot